Aboussie Park is a municipal park in St. Louis.

Geography
The park is located at 13th Street and Lynch Street in the neighborhood of Soulard. It is in a section of land adjoining the highway that was built through the neighborhood.

Notable events
Friday Nights Brights that filmed the three scenes on July 2005.

Surrounding areas

See also
People and culture of St. Louis, Missouri
Neighborhoods of St. Louis
Parks in St. Louis, Missouri

External links
Park Division: Park Descriptions

Culture of St. Louis
Parks in St. Louis
Protected areas established in 1981
1981 establishments in Missouri